Russia participated in the Junior Eurovision Song Contest 2015 which took place on 21 November 2015, in Sofia, Bulgaria. The Russian broadcaster, Russia-1, selected their entry through a televised national final. Mikhail Smirnov won it and represented Russia with his song "Mechta (Dream)". He finished 6th in the final of the contest with 80 points.

Background

The twin sisters went on to become the first act from a Junior Eurovision Song Contest to represent their country at the Eurovision Song Contest, performing the song "Shine" at the Eurovision Song Contest 2014, in Copenhagen, Denmark.

Before Junior Eurovision

National final
The Russian broadcaster, Russia-1, revealed the details about the selection on 4 August 2015, and on the same day announced that applications could be submitted between then and September 10. The original song must have at least one verse and one chorus in Russian, but up to 25% of the song can be in another language. The song must last at least 2:50 and it cannot exceed three minutes. The participants have to be Russian citizens or have a legal residence permit and be between 10 to 15 years of age. The maximum number of participants on stage is six.

Final 
The final was broadcast live on the television channel Karusel from Moscow on 25 September 2015. The winner was selected by a 50/50 jury-televote split. Viewers were be able to vote for their favorites online. The jury was composed by 7 members, including Alisa Kozhikina (who represented Russia last year), Philipp Kirkorov (Eurovision composer and singer, represented Russia in 1995) and Julia Savicheva (represented Russia in 2004 at the adult ESC). Both Philipp and Julia performed during the interval act.

Artist and song information

Mikhail Smirnov

Mikhail Smirnov (born April 30, 2003), better known by his stage name Misha Smirnov, is a Russian child singer. He represented Russia in the Junior Eurovision Song Contest 2015 with the song "Mechta".

Smirnov was born in the city of Moscow, Russia on April 30, 2003. Mikhail's success as a singer is no less impressive considering his family background - born to parents who are mathematicians, who both graduated from the Maths & Mechanics faculty at the Moscow State University. When he was three years old, Mikhail suddenly began to stutter and his parents sent him to singing lessons as part of the therapy. There, his first vocal coach noticed that Mikhail not only had a good ear for music but also a wonderful voice. His mother, who also graduated from music school and plays piano, cultivated Mikhail’s love of music throughout his childhood.

Gradually gaining skills, Mikhail began not only performing at various competitions, but also winning prizes. At the age of eight he moved studios, and hit professional level by winning many prizes in his new environment. Despite his young age, Mikhail has a large number of titles to his name from both Russian and international competitions.

Mikhail is already an experienced actor and was a finalist on the second season of the Russian TV show The Voice Kids (Голос. Дети).
Mikhail had to battle a series of strong female vocalists, many of whom rode the EDM trend with upbeat, danceable songs.

Mechta (Dream) 
Mechta (Dream) is a song by Russian child singer Mikhail Smirnov. It represented Russia in the Junior Eurovision Song Contest 2015 in Sofia, Bulgaria.

At Junior Eurovision
At the running order draw which took place on 15 November 2015, Russia were drawn to perform eighth on 21 November 2015, following  and preceding .

Voting

Detailed voting results
The following members comprised the Russian jury:
 Sati Kazanova
 Yulia Nachalova
 Sergey Shirokov
 Anna Shulgina
 Maria Kozhevnikova

Notes

References

Junior Eurovision Song Contest
Russia
2015